Ezhaiyin Aasthi is a 1955 Indian Tamil-language film directed by D. L. Ramachandar. The film stars Sowcar Janaki and Gummadi.

Cast
List adapted from the database of Film News Anandan

Male cast
Gummadi
Rajnala
Jaggayya
Sayeeram
Female cast
Sowcar Janaki
Baby Kanchana
Suryakantham
Chandrakumari

Production
The film was produced by H. M. Reddy and directed by D. L. Ramachandar who also wrote the story. Dialogues were written by Udhayakumar, Guhan and V. N. Sambandham. Annayya was in charge of cinematography while S. B. N. Krishna handled the editing. L. V. Manthra was in charge of Art direction while Rohini, Natarajan and Chopra handled the choreography. Still photography was done by Eswara Babu.

The film was also made in Telugu with the title Beedhala Aasthi.

Soundtrack
Music was composed by T. A. Kalyanam and G. Natarajan while the lyrics were penned by Guhan. Playback singers are A. P. Komala, K. Jamuna Rani, Rohini and A. M. Rajah

References

External links
 - Song by A. M. Rajah & Rohini

1950s Tamil-language films
Films scored by G. Natarajan
Films scored by T. A. Kalyanam